Shunde District, also known as Shuntak, is a district of the city of Foshan, Guangdong province, located in the Pearl River Delta. It had a population of 2,464,784 as of the 2010 census. Once a traditional agricultural county, it has become one of the most affluent counties in Guangdong and mainland China. Since 2009 it has been administrated independently of Foshan city, answerable directly to the Guangdong provincial government.

History
According to archaeological discoveries, human settlements appeared during the Spring and Autumn period. In the third year of Jinghai era (1452 AD), after the Ming dynasty suppressed the rebellion led by Huang Xiao Yang, Shunde county was formally established. Before that, this area was part of Nam Hoi county (Nanhai Xian) and Sun Hui county (Xinhui Xian).

The people of Daliang subdistrict of Shunde have a long history of consuming water buffalo cheese and milk products (particularly double skin milk dessert), which is why the township had begun promoting itself as the “Township of Milk and Honey”

Shunde was a center for the development of the mulberry and sericulture industry in Guangdong province during the late Ming Dynasty and early Qing Dynasty. It was at this time that the Comb Sister culture emerged from Shunde in opposition to the strict patriarchal feudal system, allowing unmarried women to live financially independent with the social pressure of marriage lifted. After the fall of the Qing Dynasty in 1911, the feudal system and the silk production industry collapsed, ending the local Comb Sister custom.

The first outbreak of the 2002–2004 SARS outbreak was recorded in Shunde on 16 November 2002.

Administration divisions
Shunde was a county-level city until 8 December 2002, when it became a district of Foshan prefecture-level city. Shunde has direct jurisdiction over four subdistricts and six towns:

Unique as a district of any prefecture-level city in China, Shunde has been granted a degree of prefecture-level administrative autonomy over certain matters, notably economic development, independent of Foshan city, and has been answerable directly to the Guangdong Provincial government since 2009.

Climate

Economy
Situated in the fertile Pearl River Delta, its economy was once dominated by agriculture, fisheries and silk farming. Since the implementation of policies related to reform and openness began in 1978, the people of this area were given full control over their geographical position and culture. This has allowed Shunde to gradually develop into a modern industrial boomtown, especially the manufacturing of furniture and electric appliances. Major Mainland Chinese product brands are headquartered in Shunde with major production facilities. Recently a new technology industrial park has also been opened in this area, featuring car manufacturers such as Toyota.

Major Chinese companies such as Galanz, Kelon, Country Garden and Midea, has its headquarters in Shunde District.

Shunde was approved as a pilot city for the comprehensive reform of Guangdong in 1993, and also for taking the lead in accomplishing modernization in 1999. From 2000 to 2003, Shunde was ranked first among China's top 100 counties for Basic Economic Competitiveness for four consecutive years (released by National Bureau of Statistics of China). In 2005, Shunde's GDP was 2,170 billion yuan.

Today, this area has become one of the most affluent counties in Guangdong and mainland China (according to official information from the Chinese government and the United Nations). The GDP reached 127.5 billion yuan in 2007, an annual increase of 18%, and GDP per capita reached 107,991 yuan (ca. US$14,200).

Tourism
Tourist attractions include the Qinghui Garden, which features fish ponds surrounded by osmanthus, bamboo and mulberry bushes, as well as the Bruce Lee Memorial Museum located in Jun'an. Baolin Temple is accessible through the park.

Travelling from Shunde is easy with many different options. There are ferries and buses that go directly to Hong Kong, including an option to Hong Kong International Airport. Bus tickets can be purchased at the New World Centre Hotel. Macau is easily accessible by train, taking less than an hour. Guangzhou is accessible by train, taxi or bus.

UNESCO Creative Cities
China’s southern city of Shunde joined the UNESCO Creative Cities Network as the city of gastronomy on Monday. Another 27 cities from 19 countries were also added to the list.

Shunde has long been widely regarded as the basis for exquisite Cantonese cuisine and the cradle of Cantonese cuisine chefs. While the cuisine of Guangzhou has been historically very minimalist in terms of flavorings, food from Shunde is known for its liberal use of ingredients such as sun dried tangerine peel and dates, resulting in simple but powerful flavors.

Launched in 2004, the UNESCO Creative Cities Network is celebrating its 10th anniversary this year. The network aims to foster international cooperation between cities committed to investing in creativity as a driver for sustainable urban development, social inclusion and enhanced cultural influence in the world.

By joining the network, cities commit to collaborate and develop partnerships with a view to promoting creativity and cultural industries, to share best practices, to strengthen participation in cultural life and to integrate culture in economic and social development plans.

The network covers seven thematic areas: craft and folk arts, design, film, gastronomy, Literature, media arts and music. It aims to promote international cooperation and encourage the sharing of experiences and resources to promote local development through culture and creativity.

With these new designations, the number of UNESCO Creative Cities Network members now totals 69.

Famous residents and people from the area
Martial artist Bruce Lee's ancestral roots are traced to Gwan'on (Jun'an) in Seundak (Shunde). A street in the village is named after the actor, and his ancestral home is open to the public.

Others include:
 The former Lord Mayor of Melbourne, Australia, John So.
 Real estate developer Lee Shau Kee, and, as of May 2013, the 24th richest person in the world.
 Real estate developer Yang Guoqiang
 Famous actor Law Kar Ying
 Eileen Yin-Fei Lo, Chinese-American cookbook writer
Brandon Lee, Chinese-American  film actor.
 Lee Heung-kam (1932–2021), Hong Kong Cantonese opera and TV actress

See also
 Shunde, China Furniture Wholesale Market

References

External links

 Government of Shunde
 Destination guide
 Information about Shunde

 
County-level divisions of Guangdong
Foshan